Switch Scotland is a DAB digital radio multiplex broadcasting across Scotland's Central Belt, with its coverage area encompassing major population centres such as Edinburgh and Glasgow and the surrounding area. The service overlaps with local-level DAB multiplexes centred on particular cities and towns (such as Score Glasgow and Score Edinburgh), meaning that listeners in central Scotland are able to tune into three levels of coverage - national, regional and local services.

Stations carried on Switch Scotland include relays of local FM/MW services and also of stations only available in that area on DAB. Many of the DAB-only stations are relays of programmes from other areas: Gold, Xfm and Heart originate in London and Kerrang! Radio in Birmingham.

Prior to Smooth Radio parent GMG Radio taking over the former Saga 105.2, the regional multiplex carried a relay of 102.2 Smooth Radio from London, with Glasgow-based Saga on the Glasgow and Edinburgh local multiplexes (in Edinburgh, the Glasgow service was relayed in place of the defunct Saga Digital.) After the Saga-Smooth changeover, Smooth London on the regional multiplex gave way to a relay of Glasgow's Smooth, and the ex-Saga slot on the local multiplexes was used by the GMG-owned jazzfm.com; in Glasgow this later became the new Jazz FM (UK), but in Edinburgh this slot was then used to relay another GMG-owned Glasgow-based station, 96.3 Rock Radio, instead.

Two more recent changes to services on this multiplex had both been actioned by Global Radio: the removal of rock station The Arrow in favour of a relay of the London version of Gold, and the relaunch of Xfm Scotland as Galaxy (which resulted in a change to the DAB arrangement, which had been carrying Xfm Scotland and Yorkshire-based Galaxy Digital, and changed to carrying Xfm London and Galaxy Scotland). Following the merger of Galaxy into the Capital network in January 2011, Galaxy Scotland was rebranded as Capital Scotland.

Following the relocation of Jazz FM to the Digital One multiplex, and the relaunch of Manchester's Rock Radio as 106.1 Real Radio XS, GMG made changes to their station lineup on DAB in Scotland. Smooth Radio (Glasgow) was removed from the regional multiplex and rolled down to the Glasgow local multiplex, which also continues to carry 96.3 Real Radio XS. Programme sharing between the Manchester and Glasgow rock stations ceased as GMG were initially proposing to sell the Glasgow station (though this plan was later abandoned). The ex-Smooth slot on the Central Scotland multiplex was then taken up by the Manchester-based Real XS. The ultimate aim of these changes appears to be to continue carriage of the Glasgow-area local FM franchises of Real XS and Smooth to the Glasgow DAB multiplex, whilst providing listeners in Edinburgh and elsewhere with access to the network versions of the stations.

BBC Radio Scotland is not carried on this regional multiplex: it is instead carried on the local-level multiplexes around Scotland. However, BBC Radio nan Gaidheal is carried on the regional multiplex, meaning it is not carried on the local multiplexes for Edinburgh or Glasgow (in other areas not served by this multiplex, both BBC stations operate on local muxes).

Transmitter sites 
Switch Scotland currently broadcasts using block 11D (222.064 MHz) on the following sites:

Current line-up of services 
The stations currently carried on Switch Scotland are:

References

Digital audio broadcasting multiplexes